The Hundshorn is a mountain of the Bernese Alps, located between the valleys of Kiental and Lauterbrunnen, in the Bernese Oberland. It lies just north of the Sefinenfurgge Pass and near the Schilthorn.

References

External links
 Hundshorn on Hikr

Mountains of the Alps
Mountains of Switzerland
Mountains of the canton of Bern